Elia Viviani (born 7 February 1989) is an Italian professional cyclist, who currently rides for UCI WorldTeam . On 10 May 2015, Viviani won his first Grand Tour stage victory at the Giro d'Italia, winning stage 2 in a bunch sprint before Moreno Hofland and André Greipel.

In August 2016 Viviani won gold in the omnium at the 2016 Summer Olympics. In 2021, he won bronze in the omnium at the 2020 Summer Olympics.

Viviani's nickname in the peloton is "Il Veggente" for his ability to foresee line moves of other sprinters during the sprint.

Career

Team Sky (2015–17)

2015 season
He chose Team Sky because they were willing to help tailor his road programme to help with his track ambitions at the 2016 Summer Olympics in Rio de Janeiro. After winning Stage 2 of the Dubai Tour, Viviani headed to the Track World Championships in Yvelines winning two medals including bronze in his focused Olympic event, the omnium. Back on the road Viviani made a big leap forward, consistently winning at World Tour level winning stages at the Tour de Romandie, the Eneco Tour and winning his first Grand Tour stage at the Giro d'Italia on stage 2 into Genoa. He ended the season well, becoming the European Track Champion in the omnium, gaining Olympic qualification points in the process. He also won three stages at the Tour of Britain and finished where he started the season, winning in the Middle East, this time at the Abu Dhabi Tour.

Quick-Step Floors (2018–19)

2018 season
Viviani signed for the  team before the 2018 season, replacing Marcel Kittel who joined . He got off to a good start winning Stage 3 of the Tour Down Under, the 50th victory since his professional début in 2010. He continued the momentum in the Middle East where he won his first major overall title and two stage wins at the Dubai Tour as well as a stage in the Abu Dhabi Tour. He returned to Europe for his first big objective of the season where he came 19th at Milan–San Remo. He added another success in Belgium at the Three Days of Bruges–De Panne but suffered an emotional defeat at Gent–Wevelgem, finishing in second place behind Peter Sagan. He also won the Italian National Road Race Championships.

2019 season
He again got off to a good start in Australia winning the opening stage of the Tour Down Under, and followed it up with the One-day classic Cadel Evans Great Ocean Road Race, going one better than the previous year. Viviani's next win came at the UAE Tour a month later as he had an easier build up to the two Grand Tours he was scheduled to compete in – the Giro d'Italia and the Tour de France. After winning Stage 3 of Tirreno–Adriatico, he encountered a dry spell mainly due to bad luck at the Giro d'Italia, where he was disqualified after winning a sprint on Stage 3 into Orbetello, after he was adjudged to have illegally blocked 's Matteo Moschetti. After last year's success, he failed to win a single stage in his home tour while wearing the national champion's jersey.

In his build up to the Tour de France he won two sprints in a row at the Tour de Suisse, before going onto win his first stage at the Tour de France into Nancy. Viviani came out of the Tour on top form, winning the London–Surrey Classic. After losing his national champion's jersey in June, he earned the right to wear a non standard team kit again for the following year after he won the European Championships on 11 August in Alkmaar. He won from a three-man break following the attack from trade teammate Yves Lampaert, and beating him and Pascal Ackermann in the sprint.

Cofidis (2020–21)
In August 2019, Viviani was announced to be joining  for the 2020 season along with his lead-out man Fabio Sabatini.

Ineos Grenadiers (2022–)
In November 2021, Viviani signed a three-year contract with the  team, from the 2022 season.

Personal life
Viviani is married to fellow cyclist Elena Cecchini. His brother Attilio Viviani is also a professional cyclist.

Major results

Road

2005
 European Youth Summer Olympic Festival
1st Road race
1st Criterium
 2nd Road race, National Cadet Championships
2009
 4th ZLM Tour
 7th La Côte Picarde
2010
 1st Memorial Marco Pantani
 1st Binche–Tournai–Binche
 1st Stage 7 Vuelta a Cuba
 1st Stage 7 Tour of Turkey
 3rd Gran Premio Città di Misano – Adriatico
 7th Overall Circuit Franco-Belge
2011
 1st Gran Premio della Costa Etruschi
 1st Tour de Mumbai I
 1st Coppa Città di Stresa
 USA Pro Cycling Challenge
1st Stages 4 & 5
 Giro di Padania
1st  Points classification
1st  Sprints classification
1st Stage 2
 1st Stage 4 Tour of Beijing
 1st Stage 2 Tour of Slovenia
 2nd Tour de Mumbai II
2012
 1st  Overall Giro della Provincia di Reggio Calabria
1st  Young rider classification
1st Stages 1 & 2
 1st Gran Premio della Costa Etruschi
 1st Stage 1 Tour of Beijing
 1st Stage 2a Settimana Internazionale di Coppi e Bartali
 1st Stage 6 Tour de San Luis
 2nd Memorial Marco Pantani
2013
 1st  Overall Tour of Elk Grove
1st Stages 2 & 3
 1st Dutch Food Valley Classic
 1st Stage 2 Critérium du Dauphiné
 1st Stage 1 Tour of Britain
 5th Vattenfall Cyclassics
 7th GP Ouest–France
 7th Grand Prix de Fourmies
2014
 1st Coppa Bernocchi
 Tour of Turkey
1st Stages 5 & 7
 1st Stage 3 Settimana Internazionale di Coppi e Bartali
 1st Stage 4 Tour of Slovenia
 1st Stage 4 USA Pro Challenge
 2nd Brussels Cycling Classic
 3rd Grand Prix de Fourmies
 9th RideLondon–Surrey Classic
 Giro d'Italia
Held  after Stages 5 & 6
2015
 Giro d'Italia
1st Stage 2
Held  after Stages 2–5, 7–9, 13–16
 Tour of Britain
1st Stages 1, 3 & 8
 Abu Dhabi Tour
1st  Points classification
1st Stages 2 & 4
 1st Stage 1 Eneco Tour
 1st Stage 2 Dubai Tour
 1st Stage 1 (TTT) Tour de Romandie
 2nd Trofeo Santanyi–Ses Salines–Campos
 3rd Kuurne–Brussels–Kuurne
2016
 1st Stage 2 Dubai Tour
 1st Stage 2 Three Days of De Panne
2017
 1st EuroEyes Cyclassics
 1st Bretagne Classic
 Tour of Austria
1st Stages 1 & 3
 1st Stage 3 Tour de Romandie
 1st Stage 2 Route du Sud
 1st Stage 2 Tour of Britain
 2nd  Road race, UEC European Championships
 2nd Scheldeprijs
 3rd Gran Premio Bruno Beghelli
 5th Overall Dubai Tour
 5th Overall Tour du Poitou-Charentes
1st  Points classification
1st Stages 1 & 3
 5th Coppa Bernocchi
 6th Memorial Marco Pantani
 6th Coppa Sabatini
 9th Milan–San Remo
2018
 1st  Road race, National Championships
 1st  Overall Dubai Tour
1st  Points classification
1st Stages 2 & 5
 1st EuroEyes Cyclassics
 1st Three Days of Bruges–De Panne
 Giro d'Italia
1st  Points classification
1st Stages 2, 3, 13 & 17
 Vuelta a España
1st Stages 3, 10 & 21
 Adriatica Ionica Race
1st  Points classification
1st Stages 1 (TTT), 2, 4 & 5
 Abu Dhabi Tour
1st  Points classification
1st Stage 2
 1st Stage 3 Tour Down Under
 2nd Gent–Wevelgem
 2nd Cadel Evans Great Ocean Road Race
 2nd London–Surrey Classic
 2nd Dwars door het Hageland
 6th UCI World Tour
2019
 1st  Road race, UEC European Championships
 1st Cadel Evans Great Ocean Road Race
 1st London–Surrey Classic
 1st EuroEyes Cyclassics
 UAE Tour
1st  Points classification
1st Stage 5
 Tour de Suisse
1st Stages 4 & 5
 1st Stage 4 Tour de France
 1st Stage 1 Tour Down Under
 1st Stage 3 Tirreno–Adriatico
 1st Stage 4 Okolo Slovenska
 2nd Tacx Pro Classic
 3rd Three Days of Bruges–De Panne
2020
 3rd Clásica de Almería
 9th Cadel Evans Great Ocean Road Race
 10th Race Torquay
2021
 1st Cholet-Pays de la Loire
 1st Grand Prix de Fourmies
 1st Grand Prix d'Isbergues
 Adriatica Ionica Race
1st  Points classification
1st Stages 1 & 3
 Tour Poitou-Charentes en Nouvelle-Aquitaine
1st Stages 1 & 3
 3rd Grand Prix du Morbihan
 9th Classic Brugge–De Panne
 10th Coppa Bernocchi
2022
 1st Stage 1 Tour de la Provence
 1st Stage 6 CRO Race
 6th Overall Circuit de la Sarthe
 7th Road race, UEC European Championships

Grand Tour general classification results timeline

Classics results timeline

Major championships timeline

Track

2006
 1st  Scratch race, UEC European Junior Championships
 National Junior Championships
1st  Madison
1st  Team sprint
 3rd  Madison (with Fabrizio Braggion), UCI World Junior Championships
2007
 UEC European Junior Championships
1st  Points race
3rd  Madison (with Tomas Alberio)
 1st  Madison, National Championships
 National Junior Championships
1st  Team pursuit
1st  Team sprint
3rd Scratch race
 3rd  Team pursuit, UCI World Junior Championships
2008
 UEC European Under-23 Championships
1st  Scratch race
3rd  Omnium
3rd  Team pursuit
 National Championships
1st  Team pursuit
2nd Points race
2nd Scratch race
2009
 1st  Scratch race, UEC European Under-23 Championships
 National Championships
1st  Team pursuit
1st  Omnium
2nd Madison
2010
 National Championships
1st  Omnium
3rd Madison
2011
 UEC European Under-23 Championships
1st  Omnium
1st  Points race
2nd  Madison (with Davide Cimolai)
 National Championships
1st  Individual pursuit
1st  Madison (with Davide Cimolai)
1st  Points race
2nd Scratch race
2nd Team pursuit
2nd Kilo
 1st Six Days of Fiorenzuola (with Jacopo Guarnieri)
 2nd  Scratch race, UCI World Championships
 3rd  Omnium, UEC European Championships
 3rd Omnium, UCI World Cup, Astana
2012
 UEC European Championships
1st  Points race
3rd  Madison (with Angelo Ciccone)
3rd  Team pursuit
 National Championships
1st  Derny
1st  Madison (with Michele Scartezzini)
1st  Team pursuit
 1st 3 Sere di Bassano del Grappa (with Franco Marvulli)
2013
 UEC European Championships
1st  Points race
1st  Madison (with Liam Bertazzo)
 National Championships
1st  Madison (with Michele Scartezzini)
1st  Points race
1st  Team pursuit
2nd Individual pursuit
2nd Kilo
2nd Team sprint
3rd Derny
3rd Scratch race
2014
 1st  Omnium, UEC European Championships
 National Championships
1st  Omnium
2nd Individual pursuit
2015
 1st  Omnium, UEC European Championships
 1st Six Days of Fiorenzuola (with Alex Buttazzoni)
 UCI World Championships
2nd  Madison (with Marco Coledan)
3rd  Omnium
2016
 1st  Omnium, Olympic Games
 1st Six Days of Fiorenzuola (with Michele Scartezzini)
 3rd Six Days of Ghent (with Iljo Keisse)
2017
 1st Six Days of Turin (with Francesco Lamon)
2018
 UEC European Championships
1st  Team pursuit
2nd  Omnium
 1st Six Days of Ghent (with Iljo Keisse)
 3rd Omnium, UCI World Cup, London
2019
 1st  Elimination race, UEC European Championships
 1st  Omnium, National Championships
 1st Six Days of London (with Simone Consonni)
2021
 UCI World Championships
1st  Elimination race
3rd  Omnium
 National Championships
1st  Points race
2nd Elimination race
3rd Madison (with Attilio Viviani)
 3rd  Omnium, Olympic Games
2022
 1st  Elimination race, UCI World Championships
 1st  Elimination race, UEC European Championships
 1st Elimination race, UCI Nations Cup, Glasgow
 National Championships
1st  Omnium
1st  Points race
2nd Individual pursuit
 3rd Six Days of Rotterdam (with Vincent Hoppezak)

References

External links

 
 
 

1989 births
Living people
Italian male cyclists
Italian track cyclists
Cyclists at the 2012 Summer Olympics
Cyclists at the 2016 Summer Olympics
Medalists at the 2016 Summer Olympics
Medalists at the 2020 Summer Olympics
Cyclists at the 2020 Summer Olympics
Olympic cyclists of Italy
Presidential Cycling Tour of Turkey stage winners
Cyclists from the Province of Verona
Italian Tour de France stage winners
Italian Giro d'Italia stage winners
Italian Vuelta a España stage winners
European Championships (multi-sport event) gold medalists
European Championships (multi-sport event) bronze medalists
Cyclists at the 2015 European Games
European Games competitors for Italy
Olympic gold medalists for Italy
Olympic bronze medalists for Italy
Olympic medalists in cycling
UCI Track Cycling World Champions (men)
Tour de Suisse stage winners
21st-century Italian people
20th-century Italian people